Yo Tachibana (born 17 June 1997) is a Japanese professional footballer who plays as a forward for WE League club Sanfrecce Hiroshima Regina.

Club career 
Tachibana made her WE League debut on 12 September 2021.

References 

Living people
1997 births
Japanese women's footballers
Women's association football forwards
Association football people from Aichi Prefecture
Sanfrecce Hiroshima Regina players
WE League players